The Institut d'Administration des Entreprises de Poitiers (IAE), in Poitiers, is the Business School of the University of Poitiers. From its origins it has been part of the "Réseau des IAE", first French network in management education, which includes 32 IAE all over France.

History 
The Institut d'Administration des Entreprises de Poitiers was established in 1956. It is attached to the University of Poitiers, France's second oldest university after Paris' Sorbonne.
The number of its students has constantly grown ever since its establishment, going from twenty or so in its early stages to over 2,200 registered students, including abroad sites. Currently, it offers more than 20 nationally and internationally recognized courses, either alone or in association with organizations like ESSEC or ESCE in Paris, ESC in La Rochelle, France, and many others abroad.

International 
The IAE of Poitiers has built up an international network of about 50 foreign universities in almost 25 countries thus offering wide possibilities to study abroad through the ERASMUS university exchange programme. The IAE allows the students who wish to develop their professional projects abroad and particularly in Asia, to gain the management, linguistic and cultural knowledge necessary for the development of their career, in particular in China and Japan, where several IAE alumni have moved.

Also, IAE became actively involved right from the early 1990s in Open and Distance Learning, firstly in partnership with the CNED then in association with foreign partners. In this context, it has built up ties with numerous countries such as: Benin, China, Egypt, Ethiopia, Mauritius, Lebanon, Morocco, Senegal...

Education Programmes 
The IAE manages three sites over the Poitou-Charentes (Poitiers, Niort and Angoulême), and also operates in Paris and overseas. It is the largest Higher Education Institution in Management in the West of France. Thanks to the work of 45 permanent teachers and 200 outside contributors, it teaches and trains each year over 2,200 students or company employees spread over 20 university departments, among which:

Bachelor’s Degrees 
 B.sc in Management
 Courses available in Poitiers, Niort and Angoulême, with variations corresponding to each site's special Master's subjects.
 This B.sc also exists in Open and Distance Education, for independent students or in association with several foreign Higher Education Institutions.
 B.sc in Accounting Control and Audit (CCA,  in Poitiers),
 Vocational degree  in Commerce and Distribution (Poitiers, in association with the Maison de la Formation),
 Special subjects : Counter Manager or Sales / Sales Executive

Master’s degrees 
 Finance and Accounting Division
 Master's in Accounting Control and Audit (CCA Poitiers),
 Master's in Finance and Financial Engineering (Poitiers),
 Master's degree in Management Control and Organizational Audit (formerly Information and Control Systems, Poitiers, apprenticeship in the second year of the course),
 Master's in Tax Management (Poitiers, apprenticeship in the second year of the course),
 Master's in Management and Audit in the Public Sector (Poitiers),
 Management Division
 Master's in Human Resources Management (Poitiers, apprenticeship in the second year of the course),
 Also available in Continuing Education, in Poitiers.
 Also available in Open and Distance Education.
 Master's in International Management (Poitiers),
 Also available in Open and Distance Education.
 Master's in Business Administration (MAE, Poitiers)
 Also available in Continuing Education, in Poitiers.
 Also available in Open and Distance Education.
 In a partnership with the ENSIP, students in their third year can pass this diploma.
 Master's in Sustainable Management (Poitiers, in partnership with ESC La Rochelle),
 Master's in Property Management, in partnership with ESSEC,
 Master's in Management and Administration of the Educational System Institutions (GAESE, Poitiers, in collaboration with ESEN).
 Strategy Marketing Division
 Master's in International Trade (Poitiers),
 Also available in Initial Education in Segonzac (Charente), special subject in Wines and Spirits,
 Also available in Continuing Education in Paris, in partnership with ESCE,
 Also available in Open and Distance Education.
 Master's in Marketing and Strategy (Poitiers),
 Also available in Paris, in partnership with ESCE
 Also available in Continuing Education in Poitiers.
 Master's in Marketing Products Management (Niort, apprenticeship in the second year of the course),
 Master's in Management of Child Products (Angoulême, CEPE),
 Master's in Packaging Design Management (Angoulême, CEPE).

Some of these Master's can be converted to a Research Master's in the second year of the course, with the aim of preparing for a doctorate.

Research 
Researchers and doctorate students from IAE and other faculties or institutions are all involved in the CEREGE (Research Center in Management). They are divided into several thematic research teams. Some of them work in close collaboration with companies from the private sector (BNP Paribas...) others with Ministries or with the Revenue Court.
The Centre Européen des Produits de l'Enfant (CEPE), in Angoulême, is another research team affiliated to the IAE, specialized in Marketing.
The IAE of Poitiers regularly organizes academic Congresses, either national or international. Since 2005:
 in 2005, the CIGAR 10th Congress;
 in 2006, the Annual Congress of the AFFI;
 in 2007, the Annual Congress of the AFC;
 in 2012, the 21st Annual Congress of the IAEs.
 in 2017, the 38th Annual Congress of the AFC.
 Scheduled for May 2020 Atlas AFMI International Conference.

Doctorates 
Thesis vivas over the last 15 years:

Certifications and Excellence 
The IAE of Poitiers obtained the “Training/Research” QUALICERT Certification of Services in June 2006, confirmed in 2007 and 2008. Achieving this certification of services has enhanced the efforts constantly made by the IAE of Poitiers to meet the expectations of its students and its partner-companies. The high rate of students entering the job market (76% following the latest Vivas in the second year master's degree) is a further proof of it.

References

External links 
 IAE of Poitiers Official Website
 Distance Learning site of the IAE of Poitiers
 IAE's Network Site

Educational institutions established in 1956
IAE
Poitiers
Education in Poitiers
1956 establishments in France